(born April 2, 1990) is an American professional basketball player who last played for  Union Neuchâtel in Switzerland.

College career
He played four seasons with the Wisconsin Badgers, in which he averaged 7.2 points, 3.8 rebounds and 1.2 blocks per game. In his senior season he was named to the Second Team All Big Ten Conference by both by the media the coaches, as well as being the best defensive team of the conference.

Professional career
After not being selected in the 2013 NBA Draft, he signed with B.C. Oostende of the Belgian league. In his first season on the team he averaged 7.0 points and 5.0 rebounds per game. After losing much of the following season, in July 2015 he signed for a season with the Pallacanestro Cantù of the Italian league. He played 14 games, averaging at 6.8 points and 5.2 rebounds before being fired in February 2016.

The following day he signed a contract with Aquila Basket Trento for the rest of the season, playing eleven games in which he averaged 4.0 points and 3.2 rebounds.

In August 2016 he signed for a season with the Basket Brescia Leonessa. He spent the 2017–18 season with Shinshu Brave Warriors in Japan.

On July 9, 2018, Berggren signed a one-year contract with Union Neuchâtel.

References

External links
Wisconsin Badgers bio

1990 births
Living people
American expatriate basketball people in Belgium
American expatriate basketball people in Italy
American expatriate basketball people in Japan
American expatriate basketball people in Switzerland
American men's basketball players
Aquila Basket Trento players
Basketball players from Minnesota
Basket Brescia Leonessa players
BC Oostende players
Centers (basketball)
Niigata Albirex BB players
Pallacanestro Cantù players
People from Princeton, Minnesota
Shinshu Brave Warriors players
Sportspeople from the Minneapolis–Saint Paul metropolitan area
Union Neuchâtel Basket players
Wisconsin Badgers men's basketball players